Michael Keith Richens (born 21 February 1995) is a professional footballer who plays as defender for Kettering Town.

Club career
Richens joined Nuneaton Town of the Football Conference on a one-month loan on 12 September 2013, where he made four appearances.

He joined Stevenage with Peterborough teammate Tom Conlon on loan on 13 September 2014 until January 2015, with a view to a permanent deal and made his Football League debut for Stevenage on 16 September 2014, in an away League Two match against Bury at Gigg Lane.

He then joined Nuneaton Borough on loan., making ten appearances in all competitions before leaving the club in November 2019 and returning to Kettering.

On 26 July 2021, he stepped down a division to sign for Southern Football League Premier Division Central side St Ives Town, with manager Ricky Marheineke describing Richens as a "National League standard player".

References

External links

Michael Richens profile at Aylesbury United

1995 births
Living people
English footballers
Peterborough United F.C. players
Histon F.C. players
Nuneaton Borough F.C. players
Whitehawk F.C. players
Bishop's Stortford F.C. players
Stevenage F.C. players
Kettering Town F.C. players
Biggleswade Town F.C. players
Hemel Hempstead Town F.C. players
Farnborough F.C. players
St Ives Town F.C. players
Association football defenders
English Football League players
National League (English football) players
Southern Football League players
Association football midfielders